Baby Done  is a 2020 New Zealand comedy film. Directed by Curtis Vowell and executively produced by Taika Waititi, written by Sophie Henderson, and starring Rose Matafeo.

Plot
Zoe is a young woman who discovers she's pregnant. But, acting in denial, she tries to live a wild single life before the baby arrives. Her boyfriend, Tim, has the opposite reaction to the baby news and goes into nesting mode.

Cast
Zoe - Rose Matafeo
Tim - Matthew Lewis
Brian - Nic Sampson
Molly - Emily Barclay  
Antenatal teacher - Alice Snedden

Production
Married couple Henderson and Vowell made the semi-autobiographical film out of their own fear of growing old and settling down.

Release
The film premiered in Australia and New Zealand on 22 October 2020. It was later released in the UK and Ireland on 22 January 2021.

Reception
The Guardian praised "Matafeo’s wonderful, compulsively affable performance is core to the film’s irresistible good naturedness: its spirit, pluck, bounce." The site's critical consensus reads, "A lightly humorous look at impending parenthood, Baby Done finds laughs -- and moments of genuine honesty -- in a life-altering event."

References

External links
 

2020 films
2020s New Zealand films
2020 comedy films
2020s pregnancy films
New Zealand comedy films
New Zealand pregnancy films
2020s English-language films